Ephedrophila algerialis is a species of snout moth in the genus Ephedrophila. It was described by George Hampson in 1900, and is known from Algeria, from which its species epithet is derived.

References

Epipaschiinae
Moths described in 1900
Endemic fauna of Algeria
Moths of Africa